Minor league baseball teams were based in South Bend, Indiana in various seasons beginning in 1888 through 1932, setting the foundation for the current franchise, who began play in 1988. South Bend teams played as members of the Indiana State League (1888), Central League (1903–1912), Southern Michigan League (1914–1915) and the Central League (1916–1917, 1932) under numerous monikers. These South Bend teams directly preceded South Bend becoming a Midwest League franchise in 1988. They remain in minor league play today as the South Bend Cubs.

Baseball Hall of Fame inductee Max Carey began his professional career playing for South Bend in 1909 and 1910.

History

Indiana State League 1888
Early semi–pro teams named the South Bend Green Stockings began playing in 1878. The Greenstocking Park was built in 1878 to host the early South Bend teams.

The 1888 South Bend Green Stockings were the first minor league baseball team in South Bend, Indiana, playing as members of the Independent level Indiana State League under manager Bootsey Johnson. South Bend played at Greenstocking Park in 1888.

Central League 1903–1912
The South Bend Green Stockings were Charter members of the Class B level Central League in 1903. With a record of 88–50, the Green Stockings placed 2nd in the Central League. The Green Stockings' manager was Angus Grant, who had managed the semi–professional team of the same name that preceded the 1903 Green Stockings. Grant would begin an eight–year tenure as South Bend manager, where he compiled 504 total wins. South Bend finished 1.0 games behind the 1st place Fort Wayne Railroaders and ahead of the Anderson/Grand Rapids Orphans (48–92), Dayton Veterans (61–76) Evansville River Rats (64–68), Marion Oilworkers (71–65), Terre Haute Hottentots (58–80) and Wheeling Stogies (69–68) in the final standings. The Green Stockings began play at Springbrook Park, where they would play all home games through 1932.

Becoming the South Bend Greens in the 1904 Central League, South Bend placed 3rd in the league standings. The Greens finished with a record of 75–65 in the Central League, continuing under manager Angus Grant.

The 1905 South Bend Greens continued play as members of the Class B level Central League. Managed by Angus Grant, the Greens placed 3rd in the league with a 77–62 regular season record. South Bend finished 5.5 games behind the 1st place Wheeling Stogies.

The South Bend Greens placed 7th in the eight–team 1906 Central League. South Bend finished with a record of 62–88, under Angus Grant, finishing 36.5 games behind the 1st place Grand Rapids Wolverines.

Continuing play in the 1907 Central League, the South Bend Greens finished last in the league standings. Managed by Angus Grant,South Bend finished with a 53–86 record to place 8th in the Central League standings, ending the season 35.0 games behind the 1st place Springfield Babes. On June 16, 1907, South Bend pitcher Roy Keener pitched a no–hitter against the Dayton Veterans, as South Bend defeated Dayton 4–0.

In 1908, the South Bend Greens finished in 2nd place in the Central League final standings. With a record of 80–60 under manager Angus Grant, South Bend finished 4.0 games behind the Evansville River Rats and 3.0 games ahead of the Dayton Veterans.  South Bend pitcher Cy Alberts pitched a no–hitter on May 11, 1908, as the Greens defeated the Wheeling Stogies 7–0.

The 1909 South Bend Greens placed 6th in the Central League, managed by Angus Grant. The Greens had a record of 64–72. South Bend finished 20.5 games behind the league champion Wheeling Stooges. Baseball Hall of Fame member Max Carey made his professional debut for South Bend, as a 19-year–old. Carey hit .158, playing in 48 games.

The South Bend Bronchos won the 1910 Central League Championship. With a regular season record of 88–50, South Bend finished 1st in the standings under managers Ed Wheeler and Midge Craven. South Bend finished 8.5 games ahead of the 2nd place Fort Wayne Billikens in the final league standings. Baseball Hall of Famer Max Carey hit .293, with 36 stolen bases for the 1910 Bronchos championship team.

South Bend hosted two separate teams in the 1911 Central League. The South Bend team began the 1911 season as the South Bend Benders. On July 13, 1911, the South Bend Benders then moved to Grand Rapids, Michigan, where they became the Grand Rapids Grads. The South Bend/Grand Rapids team was 42–36 in South Bend and finished 73–61 overall, placing 4th in the Central League. Their manager in both locations was Ed Smith.

The second South Bend team of 1911 was the South Bend Bux, also playing in the Central League. On August 11, 1911, the Evansville Strikers moved to South Bend with a 54–54 record. The Evansville/South Bend team finished with an overall record of 62–72. The Bux finished in 5th place. playing under managers Harry Arndt and the returning Angus Grant.

South Bend remained in the 1912 Central League, returning to the South Bend "Benders" moniker. On the field, the team placed last in the 12–team Central League, after the league had expanded. South Bend ended the season with a record of 41–88, finishing 36.0 games behind the 1st Place Fort Wayne Railroaders. The South Bend franchise folded after the season and did not return to the 1913 Central League.

Southern Michigan League 1914–1915 / Central League 1916–1917
In 1914, the South Bend Benders returned to play as members of the Class C level Southern Michigan League, also called the Southern Michigan "Association." In their first Southern Michigan League season, South Bend placed fourth in the ten–team league. The Benders finished with a record of 85–60, ending the season 10.5 games behind the first place Bay City Beavers. The 1914 managers were Ed Smith and Ben Koehler.

The South Bend Factors won the 1915 Southern Michigan League Championship. The South Bend Factors were in 1st place in the league standings when the league folded mid–season. The Southern Michigan League permanently disbanded on July 7, 1915. With a 44–24 record, South Bend placed first, playing the season under manager Ed Smith. South Bend finished 10.5 games ahead of the second place Battle Creek Crickets in the six–team league.

South Bend returned to play as members of the Class B level Central League in 1916, continuing play at Springbrook Park. The 1916 South Bend Benders placed seventh in the eight–team Central League. With a record of 56–77, South Bend finished 31.5 games behind the champion Grand Rapids Black Sox. The 1916 Benders' managers were Ben Koehler and Lee Tannehill.

The 1917 South Bend Benders moved to Peoria, Illinois during the Central League Season and the team made the playoffs. On July 8, 1917, South Bend was 40–20 under player/manager Bill Jackson, when the franchise moved to Peoria to finish the season as the Peoria Distillers. With an overall record of 66–55, South Bend/Peoria placed third in the Central League final standings. They were managed by Harry Smith (26–35) and Jackson. In the 1917 Playoffs, the Grand Rapids Black Sox defeated the South Bend Benders/Peoria Distillers 4 games to 3.

Central League 1932
South Bend was without a minor league team until the 1932 South Bend Twins played as members of the Central League. The Twins permanently folded on July 21, 1932, along with the Canton Terriers. The South Bend Twins had a record of 29–57 and were 5th in the six–team league when the franchise folded. The 1932 managers were Jesse Altenburg, Clarence Roper and Whitey Belber. The 1932 South Bend Twins were the last minor league team in South Bend until 1988.

After the minor league teams, the South Bend Blue Sox women's teams played as members of the All-American Girls Professional Baseball League (AAGPBL) from 1943 to 1954. The South Bend Blue Sox and the famed Rockford Peaches were the only two teams to play for the duration of the AAGBPL.

1988–present

In 1988, South Bend resumed minor league play as the South Bend White Sox became members of the Class A level Midwest League. The South Bend Cubs, continue minor league play today.

Ballparks
In 1888, South Bend reportedly played home games at Greenstocking Park. Built in 1878 for the semi–pro South Bend Green Stockings, Greenstocking Park had a capacity of 2,000–2,500. The ballpark was located at the corners of Napier Street, Thomas Street and McPherson Street in South Bend, Indiana.

Beginning in 1903, through 1932, South Bend teams were noted to have played home games at Springbrook Park. The ballpark and surrounding park area were later renamed Playland Park in 1925 after the Northern Indiana Railway Company purchased the Springbrook Park grounds. The Northern Indiana Railway Company utilized the area as an amusement park and picnic area for train riders. The ballpark had a capacity of 3,500. Springboard Park was located south of the St. Joseph River near Ironwood Road and Lincoln Way East Drive in South Bend, Indiana. Today, the Indiana University-South Bend student apartments are located at the site.

Timeline

Notable alumni

Baseball Hall of Fame alumni
Max Carey (1909–1910) Inducted, 1961

Notable alumni
Cy Alberts (1908–1909)
Goat Anderson (1903–1904, 1906)
Walter Anderson (1916)
Harry Arndt (1912, MGR)
Charlie Babb (1906)
Tom Bannon (1904)
Al Bashang (1916–1917)
Fred Beck (1917)
Bill Bowman (1888)
Abe Bowman (1916)
Donie Bush (1907)
Harry Camnitz (1911)
Tom Cantwell (1911)
Ed Cermak (1907)
Frank Cross (1907)
Gene Curtis (1907)
Rex DeVogt (1916)
Lee Dunham (1932)
Jim Eschen (1915)
Cecil Ferguson (1903–1904)
Phil Geier (1911)
Billy Hart (1888)
Herbert Hill (1915–1916)
Tex Hoffman (1917)
Ducky Holmes (1910–1911)
Bill Jackson (1917, MGR)
Elmer Johnson (1907)
George Kaiserling (1912)
Speed Kelly (1907–1909, 1911)
Ben Koehler (1908–1911, 1915) (1914, 1916, MGR)
Harry LaRoss (1917)
Tom Letcher (1905)
Lou Lowdermilk (1914–1916)
Len Madden (1912)
Danny Mahoney (1912)
Alex McCarthy (1910)
Alex McColl (1916)
Bing Miller (1917)
Pete O'Brien (1911)
Bob O'Farrell (1917)
Charlie Pechous (1917)
Hal Reilly (1916)
Bill Richardson (1906)
Frank Quinn (1904)
Lou Schettler (1917)
Ed Schorr (1914)
Frank Shaughnessy (1906) Canadian Football Hall of Fame
Hosea Siner (1907)
Phil Slattery (1917)
Ed Smith (1909–1910) (1914–1915, MGR)
Jesse Tannehill (1912)
Lee Tannehill (1916, MGR)
Jack Taylor (1911)
Jim Tray (1888)
Harry Truby (1888)
Jimmy Walsh (1909)
Art Watson (1906, 1910)
Harry Welchonce (1910)
Charlie Wheatley (1917)
Ed Wheeler (1910)
Gene Wheeler (1907)
Tom Williams (1906–1907)
Frank Withrow (1916)
Matt Zeiser (1916)

See also
South Bend Benders players
South Bend Bronchos players
South Bend Bux players
South Bend Greens players

References

External links
Baseball Reference

Sports in South Bend, Indiana